In mathematics, Green formula may refer to:

 Green's theorem in integral calculus
 Green's identities in vector calculus
 Green's function in differential equations
 the Green formula for the Green measure in stochastic analysis